was a Japanese science fiction, fantasy, and horror author. His name is alternatively transliterated as Ryō Hammura.

He won the first Izumi Kyōka Prize for Literature for his novel  in 1973. He won the Naoki Prize for his 1975 novel . He won also the 1988 Nihon SF Taisho Award.

One of his novels was the basis of the 1979 film . A series of role-playing video games called  is loosely based on his novel by the same name.

Works in English translation 

 

Works

Selected novels 

 (contained Sengoku Jieitai)

etc.

References

The Encyclopedia of Science Fiction, page 641

External links
Hanbunko(半文居) Official Web Site (Japanese only)
Brief obituary at Time under "Ryo Hammura"

Hanmura Ryō in The Encyclopedia of Science Fiction

1933 births
Japanese science fiction writers
2002 deaths
Japanese horror writers
Japanese fantasy writers
Japanese alternate history writers
Naoki Prize winners